I'm Your Woman is the first album released by comedian and singer Sandra Bernhard. It was released on the Mercury label on vinyl and cassette in 1985.  It has never had an official release on compact disc, although CD-R copies were once available for sale on Bernhard's own website and at her live shows. The album is a studio recording and contains eight songs interspersed with spoken-word vignettes.

Track listing
Source:

Credits
Music produced and arranged by Barry Reynolds
Recorded at The Fallout Shelter, London
Mastered by Greg Calbi, Sterling Sound, New York
Keyboards: Rupert Black, Barry Reynolds
Guitars: Robert John Tolchard, Mikey Mao Chung, Barry Reynolds
Bass: Mikey Mao Chung
Drums: Terry Stannard
Background vocals: Adele Bertei, Robert John Tolchard, Barrington Fox Reynolds III
Engineer: Stephen Street

Talk produced by Irene Pinn
Recorded at The Strongroom, London
Engineer: Philip Bodger

References

External links
Sandra Bernhard official website

Sandra Bernhard albums
1985 live albums
1985 debut albums
1980s comedy albums
Mercury Records albums